The Calgary Curling Club is a curling club located in Calgary, Alberta.

History
The Calgary Curling Club was founded in 1888 and opened its first rink in 1892. It then moved venues to Victoria Park in 1909, and moved from there to its current location in 1953. The club won the 2018 Travelers Curling Club Championship.

Notable members
Cheryl Bernard
Crystal Webster

Curlers Corner
The Curlers Corner equipment shop is located inside of the Calgary Curling Club. The club hosts the Curlers Corner Autumn Gold Curling Classic, a former women's Grand Slam event on the World Curling Tour sponsored by the Curlers Corner equipment shop, every year.

Provincial champions
The club has won a number of provincial curling titles over the years:

Women's
The club has won the women's provincial championships once:
1981 Susan Seitz, Judy Erickson, Myrna McKay, Betty McCracken (1981 Canadian Ladies Curling Association Championship winners, 1981 Royal Bank of Scotland World Women's Curling Championship silver medalists; team also credited as from the North Hill Curling Club).

Junior Women's
1971: Shelby McKenzie, Marlene Pargeter, Arlene Hrdlicka, Debbie Goliss (Canadian Junior Curling Championships winners)
1976: Jill Silverthrone, Janice Marchand, Rita Leonard, Kathy Campbell
1979: Sandra Knights, Wanda McMurdo, Tracy Sloan, Dianne Kadonga
1998: Bronwen Saunders, Jennifer Vejprava, Tara Runquist, Erika Hildebrand 
1999: Kyla MacLachlan, Chantel Paradis, Sara Gartner, Lyndsey Wegmann
2002: Jennifer Vejprava, Erika Hildebrand, Kristen Moore, Susan Loftus
2008: Maria Bushell, Jenn Liner, Jody Keim, Heather Rogers
2010: Nadine Chyz, Rebecca Pattison, Kristina Hadden, Kimberly Anderson

Senior women
1979: Alice Crawford, Peggy Bogart, Jean Cherry, Margaret Clarke
1981: Bea Mayer, Eileen Cyr, Leah Nate, Alice Vejprava (Canadian Senior Curling Championships winners)
1982: Jean Hugh, Evelyn Robertson, Shirley Morrison, Isobel Henderson
1983: Bea Mayer, Marg Scott, Leah Nate, Phyllis Barry
1984: Bea Mayer, Marg Scott, Leah Nate, Alice Vejprava
1993: Cordella Schwengler, Marjorie Stewart, Marjorie Kushnir, Nora Eaves 
1994: Cordella Schwengler, Marjorie Stewart, Marjorie Kushnir, Nora Eaves (Canadian Senior Curling Championships winners)
1998: Cordella Schwengler, Marj Stewart, Marilyn Bratton, Nora Eaves
1999: Sandra Turner, Cordella Schwengler, Marilyn Toews, Arlene Breckenridge 
2001: Susan Seitz, Heather Loat, Darlene Breckenridge, Sharen McLean
2008: Sandy Turner, Linda Wagner, Marilyn Toews, Judy Carr
2009: Peggy Harper, Judy Pendergast, Deb Pendergast, Cheryl Meek

Master Women's
1995: Peggy Bogart, Jean Smith, Flo Markin Alice Lavery
2000: Phyl Raymond, Toni Ironside, Vida Roseboom, Jackie Ogryzio
2003: Cordella Schwengler, Toni Ironside, Amy Sawby, Jackie Ogryzlo
2004: Sandy Turner, Marilyn Toews, Ioline Meier, Betty Clarke
2005: Mary Lynn Oates, Sandy Turner, Marilyn Toews, Betty Clarke
2007: Linda Wagner, Sandy Turner, Marilyn Toews, Betty Clarke (Canadian Masters Curling Championships winners)
2008: Mary Lynn Oates, Heather Paul-Scott, Sylvia Babich, Linda Pratt (Canadian Masters Curling Championships winners; shared with Inglewood Curling Club)
2009: Sandy Turner, Linda Wagner, Mairlyn Toews, Judy Carr
2010: Sandy Turner, Judy Carr, Marilyn Toews, Betty Clarke
2013: Linda Wagner, Sandy Turner, Judy Carr, Marilyn Toews
2015: Linda Wagner, Sandy Turner, Judy Carr, Marilyn Toews
2016: Susan Seitz, Jill Hodgins Ukrainec, Barb McDonald, Jane Bleaney
2017: Diane Foster, Shelly Bildfell, Jill Hodgins Ukrainec, Donna McLeod

Men's
The club has won the men's provincial championships 14 times:

1935: Robert Alexander, Howard Palmer, Cyril Glover, Walter McLaws
1939: Howard Baker, Jacob Curliss, Ernest Irving, St. Clair Webb
1941: Howard Palmer, Jack Lebeau, Arthur Gooder, Clare Webb (Macdonald Brier champions)
1947: Howard Palmer, Robert Munro, I. O. Chubb, William Watson
1960: Stu Beagle, Jimmy Shields, Ron Baker, Fred Storey
1963: Jimmy Shields, Ron Northcott, Ron Baker, Fred Storey
1964: Ron Northcott, Mike Chernoff, Ron Baker, Fred Storey
1965: Nick Laschuk, Slim Otterson, Ken Hamilton, Don Jarrett
1966: Ron Northcott, George Fink, Bernie Sparkes, Fred Storey (1966 Macdonald Brier and 1966 Scotch Cup gold medallists)
1967:  Ron Northcott, George Fink, Bernie Sparkes, Fred Storey
1968: Ron Northcott, Jimmy Shields, Bernie Sparkes, Fred Storey (1968 Macdonald Brier and 1968 Air Canada Silver Broom gold medallists)
1969: Ron Northcott, Dave Gerlach, Bernie Sparkes, Fred Storey (1969 Macdonald Brier and 1969 Air Canada Silver Broom gold medallists)
1976: Wayne Sokolosky, Frank Morrisette, John Cottam, Shane Wylie
1984: Ed Lukowich, John Ferguson, Neil Houston, Brent Syme

U18 men's
2004: Charley Thomas, Brock Virtue, Matthew Ng, Camerson Rustad

Junior men's
1957: Alf Scheiman, Bill Reeves, Tom Hilton, Ivor Warnick
1968: Ron Kelly, Burnie Cox, George Mader, Jim Sopher

Senior men's
1970: R. M. Otterson, Bob Manahan, Shirley Salt, Bill Leew
1972: Slim Otterson, Dunc Grant, Shirley Salt, Fred Blight
1982: Ray Tull, Bud Purkiss, Ian Sherrington, Tom Hugh
1985: Bill Clark, Lee Green, Bob Marshall, John Mayer
1988: Bill Clark, Cy Little, Murray MacDonald, John Mayer (Canadian Senior Curling Championships winners) 
1989: Bill Clark, Cy Little, Murray MacDonald, John Mayer
1991: Bill Clark, Cy Little, Herb Pearson, Jim Pringle

Masters men's
1994: Bill Clark, Murray MacDonald, Bud Purkiss, Dan Schmaltz
1996: Bill Clark, Cy Little, Murray MacDonald, Bud Purkiss
1997: Bill Clark, Cy Little, Murray MacDonald, Bud Purkiss
1998: Bill Clark, Cy Little, Murray MacDonald, Bud Purkiss
2001: Bill Clark, Herb Pearson, Will Sanders, Dan Schmaltz
2003: Maurice Patridge, Jim Strain, Paul Nickell, Jim Lees
2006: Art Assman, Lloyd Heller, Guenther Theophile, John Kennedy

Mixed
1965: Lee Green, Kay Berreth, Shirley Salt, Vi Salt (Canadian Mixed Curling Championship winners)
1996: Lee Green, Kay Berreth, Shirley Salt, Donna Clark
2008: Dean Ross, Susan O'Connor, Tim Krassman, Susan Wright (2008 Canadian Mixed Curling Championship winners)

Wheelchair
2012: Bruno Yizek, Jack Smart, Anne Hibberd, Martin Purvis
2013: Bruno Yizek, Jack Smart, Martin Purvis, Anne Hibberd
2014: Jack Smart, Bruno Yizek, Martin Purvis, Anne Hibberd
2016: Jack Smart, Bruno Yizek, Martin Purvis, Anne Hibberd

References

External links
Calgary Curling Club

Curling clubs in Canada
Sports venues in Calgary
1888 establishments in Canada
Curling clubs established in 1888
Curling in Alberta